Hubbard Woods is a station on Metra's Union Pacific North Line located in Winnetka, Illinois. Hubbard Woods is located at 1065 Gage Street. Trains continue as far north as Kenosha, Wisconsin. In Metra's zone-based fare system, Hubbard Woods is in Zone D. As of 2018, Hubbard Woods is the 120th busiest of Metra's 236 non-downtown stations, with an average of 396 weekday boardings.

Hubbard Woods consists of a station and two side platforms which serve two tracks, with northbound trains using the west platform and southbound trains use the east platform. The station is located at street level and is open from 5:15 A.M. to 1:00 P.M. The platforms at Hubbard Woods are located in a below-grade depression. The platforms are accessible from Scott Avenue as well as a pedestrian bridge adjacent to the station house. Parking is available at Hubbard Woods.

As of April 25, 2022, Hubbard Woods is served by 23 inbound trains and 21 outbound trains on weekdays, by 11 trains in each direction on Saturdays, and by eight trains in each direction on Sundays.

The Green Bay Trail, a hiking and bicycle trail, runs parallel to the train tracks at Hubbard Woods and is accessible from the platforms. Until November 2015, this station had a ticket agent.

History
Hubbard Woods and the other two Metra stations in Winnetka were built by the former Chicago and North Western Railway. These stations were originally built at grade level like all other Union Pacific/North Line stations north of Evanston Central Street. However, the grade crossings were not very safe, and accidents at railroad crossings resulted in twenty-nine deaths between 1912 and 1937. After two prominent Winnetka women were killed by a train at the Pine Street crossing in October 1937, the community of Winnetka demanded that something be done about the railroad crossings. It was decided that the railroad tracks would be lowered into a below-grade trench to eliminate street crossings. The project which lowered the tracks was partly funded by the Public Works Administration and was completed in 1943 after five years of work. Hubbard Woods and Winnetka stations are located in the trench, and Indian Hill is an elevated station just south of the trench. The tracks of the electric Chicago North Shore and Milwaukee Railroad, The "North Shore Line", (which were since abandoned and whose right-of-way is now part of the Green Bay Trail recreational path) were also relocated at this time and tracks were shared for periods during construction.

Bus connections
Pace

References

External links

Metra - Hubbard Woods
Entrance from Google Maps Street View

Metra stations in Illinois
Former Chicago and North Western Railway stations
Winnetka, Illinois
Railway stations in Cook County, Illinois
Railway stations in the United States opened in 1943
Union Pacific North Line